Headbands of Hope LLC is an organization founded by Jessica Ekstrom who wanted to make a difference in the lives of children battling cancer. For every item sold, a headband is donated to a child battling cancer. Since launching in 2012, Headbands of Hope has donated over 285,000 headbands to every hospital across the United States and in thirteen countries in addition, in more recent times she's donated around 650,000 headbands to children with illnesses globally. Headbands of Hope is carried in thousands of stores across the world. They've been featured on the TODAY Show, Good Morning America, Vanity Fair, Seventeen Magazine, and even supported by celebrities like Lea Michele, Lauren Conrad, Kelsea Ballerini, Lili Reinhart and more.    Headbands of Hope is a for-profit organization.

History 
Headbands of Hope was envisioned by Ekstrom after an internship at the  Make-A-Wish Foundation in 2011.  Noticing that many girls who received treatment preferred wearing headbands instead of wigs, Ekstrom began to work  distributing headbands to them. The organization  launched in April 2012. By January 31, 2013, the organization had donated more than 3,000 headbands. The  style of delivery, sending the headbands to hospitals rather than individual patients, was taken from TOMS Shoes, a supporter of the organization. Other products include shirts and bumper stickers.

Production
The headbands, made in a variety of shapes and sizes, are mostly adjustable. They are tagged and branded in their warehouse in Cornelius, North Carolina.  Ekstrom chose the company with help from the College of Design and the College of Textiles at North Carolina State University, where she graduated. Styles are determined by Ekstrom and her team of designers, who look at popular trends  .

Outside the United States, production has extended to Canada and is distribution is planned to expand   in Peru in 2014.

Marketing
The headbands are marketed by representatives on college campuses. By January 2013, there were over 20 representatives  The "Hope Club,"  allows cancer patients who have received headbands to post photos and biographies.  The enterprise has received recognition from both NBC's Today Show and Fitness Magazine.

Recently, the organization has started marketing more general headwear through Headwear of Hope, donating headwear to young boys undergoing cancer treatment. Like the parent organization, along with each item it donates $1 to the St. Baldrick's Foundation .

A recent startup 2017 in Providence, Rhode Island called Impact Everything uses the slogan "Every Purchase has a Purpose", The company only sells items that have some form of a donation to a cause, seeks wholesalers that hire "marginalized people", and currently contributes to 12 different causes. Wholesale companies include "Headband of Hope" and for every headband purchased "Impact Everything" donates a headband directly to a child with cancer at Hasbro Children's Hospital.

References

External links
 www.headbandsofhope.org Official Site

Companies based in Raleigh, North Carolina
Fashion accessory companies
Cancer awareness